Hans Aeschbacher (18 January 1906 – 27 January 1980) was a Swiss abstract sculptor.

Personal life
Aeschbacher was born in Zurich.

Career
Though originally trained as a printer, he taught himself to draw and paint. At the age of about 30 years old, he began to sculpt.

His early works were predominantly terra-cotta and plaster, but by 1945, he was sculpting almost exclusively with stone. His earlier sculptures were very abstract and geometrical, and also quite large in size. In the mid-1950s, Aeschbacher began using mostly volcanic rock as a medium, and his sculptures became more fluid and smaller.

His work Explorer I is located at the Zurich Airport.

Death and legacy
Aeschbacher died in Zurich on 27 January 1980.

References

20th-century Swiss painters
Swiss male painters
1906 births
1980 deaths
20th-century Swiss sculptors
20th-century Swiss male artists